Johann von Szabados (18 December 1906 – 13 January 1995) was an Austrian weightlifter. He competed in the men's light heavyweight event at the 1936 Summer Olympics.

References

1906 births
1995 deaths
Austrian male weightlifters
Olympic weightlifters of Austria
Weightlifters at the 1936 Summer Olympics
Place of birth missing